Dipping tobacco  is a type of finely ground or shredded, moistened smokeless tobacco product. It is commonly and idiomatically known as "dip". Dipping tobacco is used by placing a pinch, or "dip", of tobacco between the lip and the gum (sublabial administration). The act of using it is called dipping. Dip is colloquially called "chaw", "snuff", "rub", or "fresh leaf" among other terms; because of this, it is sometimes confused with other tobacco products—namely nasal/dry snuff.

History 
Dipping tobacco evolved from the use of dry snuff in early American history.  Up until the late 1700s, dry snuff was taken nasally, but then early Americans would take snuff orally by chewing the end of a twig until it resembled a brush, and then "dipping" the twig in the snuff and placing it in their mouths until the snuff dissolved. Using dry snuff orally eventually evolved into modern day moist snuff, which Copenhagen introduced in 1822 and then Skoal started producing in 1934.  Most varieties of dipping tobacco are much more recent inventions.

Today, moist snuff is available throughout the United States.  However, it is typically more popular in rural areas and the South than in large cities.  Dipping tobacco is predominantly used by males.  Also, dipping tobacco has a similar presence in Canada. Smokeless tobacco use by professional baseball players was widespread throughout the 20th century until more recent years with the MLB cracking down on tobacco consumption, although a 1999 survey reported that "31 percent of the league's rookies used smokeless tobacco". According to recent reports from NFL players, many professional football players chew tobacco in locker rooms, with some teams reporting that up to 75% of players admit to dipping.

Description 

Dipping tobacco is packaged in "tins" or "cans", although they are not typically completely metal anymore.  Dipping tobacco is also available in "rolls", "logs", or "sleeves", which is a package of 5 tins of tobacco, a similar concept to that of a carton of cigarettes.  Ten tin rolls were also available in the past.  Another package of dipping tobacco is the "tub", available in only select brands, equivalent to 6, 10, or 12 cans.

Before opening the can/tin of tobacco, users typically "pack" the can, similar to how cigarette smokers pack a pack of cigarettes. This is done by placing one's thumb and middle finger on the sides of the can, and then quickly turning the can and flicking the wrist so that one's index finger taps the top of the can.

Unlike snus, which is most often placed between the upper lip and gum, moist tobacco users or "dippers" tend to use the lower. Dipping in the upper lip is unusual, though when done, it is colloquially termed an "upper decker" or "top lip dip". The dip rests on the inside lining of the mouth for a period depending upon the user's preference—often 20–40 minutes. Nicotine and other alkaloids found in tobacco are absorbed in saliva sublabially by the inferior or superior labial arteries. Buccal and sublingual absorption may also occur.

Also unlike snus, dip often causes the user to produce excess saliva during the act of dipping. This is typically spit onto the ground or in a container, because swallowing the saliva-tobacco mixture can cause irritation to the esophagus and induce nausea and vomiting. A spittoon can be used, but often users will simply use an empty plastic bottle or a "mudjug," a portable spittoon. Smokeless tobacco is sometimes used in the workplace by employees, especially if the employer does not provide many cigarette breaks or if the employee is consistently using both hands during work (which doesn't provide opportunities for cigarette smoking). Smokeless tobacco is popular in many industrial areas where there is a safety risk in having an open flame, such as oil rigs or refineries.

Etymology and terminology  

Dipping tobacco was first popularized and marketed as moist snuff in the 1800s. The term "snuff" in this context is an English cognate of the aforementioned "snus", from Swedish. Dipping tobacco's Scandinavian roots impart a noticeable legacy on modern American brands such as Copenhagen and Skoal (referring to the interlinguistic term skål, which in Danish, Norwegian, Icelandic, Faroese and Swedish roughly translates to "cheers", implying a toast).

A user of dipping tobacco will produce an excess amount of saliva which will be disposed of using a "spitter." A spitter can be an empty bottle, cup or commercially produced spittoon.

Dipping tobacco use is often accompanied by first drinking a liquid, in some areas known as a primer, catalyst, and rinser. A primer is used to initially salivate the mouth, usually during a meal, in order to prepare the mouth to use smokeless tobacco. This is important because a dry mouth or one full of food could lead to a less enjoyable experience for the user. A catalyst, like a primer, is used to fix the issues of a dry mouth or dry tobacco; however, the dipping tobacco is already currently in the user's lip. A rinser is used when the user is finished with their tobacco, and it is swished around in the user's mouth, similar to mouthwash, to dispose of any excess tobacco juice or particulates. All three liquids are usually water, but any liquid may be used.

Primarily in Texas and other southern US states, terminology is unique. Dip or dips refers to a wad of tobacco, whereas snuff refers to any amount of tobacco greater than a dip. Many areas have no such distinction, and may rarely use the word "snuff".

Cut sizes 

The difference between cut sizes is the length of the strands of dip.

Common cut sizes
Extra Long cuts are a little longer than long cut.
Wide cuts are long cut, just a little wider.
Long cuts are the most widely available cut size.
Fine cuts/snuffs are slightly larger than sand or coffee grounds.
Pouches hold fine cut or snuff tobacco in a small, teabag-like pouch. They are initially less messy because the tobacco will not fall out of the user's fingers and mouth. Dipping tobacco in pouches resemble snus "portions", but the difference between these two products lies in the way the tobacco is processed. Dipping tobacco (including pouched products) undergoes fermentation, whereas tobacco in snus is pasteurized. In addition to regular sized pouches, smaller sized pouches, known as Bandits, are also available in the Skoal brand.

Unique cut sizes
The following cuts are either unique to one brand of dipping tobacco or are extremely rare:
Fat cuts are a little longer, flatter, and softer than long cut.
Mid cuts are comparable to small granules at about  cubed. Mid cuts are extremely rare; the original version of Copenhagen Black is the only dip marketed as a mid cut that has made it to the market. However, many consider some products marketed as long cuts to be mid cuts, notably Copenhagen Long Cut Original.
ReadyCut is a cut produced only by Skoal (introduced in 2012) which consists of a compressed cube of long cut. As it gets moist from saliva in the mouth, it automatically conforms to the user's mouth.
Wide cut is a new cut introduced by Grizzly in select markets. It consists of wider strands than long cut. Grizzly Wide Cut Wintergreen is the only wide cut available.

Flavoring
Dipping tobacco is typically flavored. The most common flavors consist of mint, wintergreen, straight, and natural.

Health issues

Effects 
Dipping tobacco, like other tobacco products, contains the stimulant nicotine.  Effects include increased heart rate, an increase in systolic blood pressure, and an increase in adrenaline.

Long-term effects 
Long term use results in whitening of the oral mucosa, termed smokeless tobacco keratosis. There is relatively low risk of transformation of this lesion into mouth cancer (sometimes verrucous carcinoma). Dipping tobacco causes fatal oral cancers, tooth and gum loss.  Associated cancers include: tongue cancer, lip cancer, cheek cancer, gum cancer, throat cancer, and cancer in the roof and floor of the mouth.

A 2002 epidemiological literature review noted "The use of moist snuff and chewing tobacco imposes minimal risks for cancers of the oral cavity and other upper respiratory sites, with relative risks ranging from 0.6 to 1.7." A study comparing oral cancer mortality rates of West Virginia (the state with the highest consumption of smokeless tobacco) in the early nineties to the US overall average throughout the years 1950 to 1980 found no apparent increased incidence or mortality. A study, pooling results from 11 studies between 1981 and 2006, found that users of smokeless tobacco are at elevated risk of getting head and neck cancer, particularly oral cavity cancer.

Cardiovascular effects 
Studies are inconclusive as to how significantly smokeless tobacco affects users' cardiovascular systems, but it has been suggested that it may have less nicotine than cigarettes.  One study states that, "Although the evidence is not conclusive, the adverse cardiovascular effects of smokeless tobacco use are less than those caused by smoking but are more than those found in non-users." Other studies also indicate that smokeless tobacco related cardiovascular risks are lower than that of smoked tobacco. One study states that smokeless tobacco use has a "positive effect on cardiovascular risk factors in young physically fit men."
However, one Indian study from the state of Rajasthan states, "There is a significantly greater prevalence of multiple cardiovascular risk factors obesity, resting tachycardia, hypertension, high total and LDL cholesterol, and low HDL cholesterol, and electrocardiographic changes in tobacco users, chewing or smoking, as compared-to tobacco non-users. Chewing tobacco is associated with similar cardiovascular risk as smoking."

Due to contrasting results in studies, many conclude that further research should be done on the cardiovascular risks of smokeless tobacco.

Addiction potential 
Smokeless tobacco contains nicotine, which is addictive thus the primary reinforcing agent.

According to European Union policy advice, Scandinavian or some American smokeless tobaccos (specifically snus) may be up to 90% less hazardous than cigarette smoking. However, the habit is still addictive.

Taxation and restriction of smoking is causing more smokeless tobacco use as "substitution." There have been public health debates regarding risk-reduction for smokers and the reconsideration of smokeless tobacco risks. "...There is a substantial body of informed and independent opinion that sees the value of harm reduction strategies based on smokeless tobacco."

Additives 
The amount of nicotine absorbed can be controlled by different cutting of the tobacco, increasing the nicotine concentration and raising the pH of the tobacco by adding various salts. An alkaline pH causes more nicotine to be absorbed, especially the free, unprotonated form, but is irritating to the mucosa. Nicotine itself can also irritate the mucosa.

List of brands 
The following is a partial list of brands of dipping tobacco. Other tobacco products, such as chewing tobacco and snus, are excluded.

 Copenhagen
 Grizzly 
 Happy Days discontinued 
 Husky
 Kodiak
 Longhorn
 Red Man
 Red Seal
 Rooster (discontinued in 2009)
Stoker's
 Skoal
 Timber Wolf
 Tough Guy (discontinued in 2018)

Legality 
Several countries have banned the sale (and in some cases the import) of dipping tobacco. Sale of dipping tobacco was banned in South Australia in 1986 and across the country in 1991 and in most of the EU nations in 1993. Sweden was exempt from this ban because of the traditionally high usage of snus in that country. Dipping tobacco is also not currently permitted for sale in the UK. It is not yet clear whether this law will be changed now that the UK has left the EU.

In the United States, the Family Smoking Prevention and Tobacco Control Act gives the Food and Drug Administration the power to regulate the tobacco industry. This law prohibits the sale of dipping tobacco to anyone under the age of 21, as of 20 December restricts tobacco product advertising and marketing directed to younger audiences, and requires bigger, more prominent warning labels for dipping tobacco products.

Taxation
Excise taxes are also levied at the state level (Pennsylvania being the only exception), and in some instances, at the local level. Sales tax is also applied to the full retail price of dipping tobacco in most jurisdictions. The price of a tin of tobacco can range anywhere from under $1 per tin to more than $8. Price is affected by factors such as brand and especially the varying excise taxes from state to state.

See also 
Herbal dipping tobacco
Naswar
Smoking cessation
Snus
Tobacco industry
Tobacco products

References

External links 
 Smokeout: Not as easy as ABC - Commentary - The Washington Times, America's Newspaper

SnusOn Community - The world's largest forum community centered around Swedish snus and smokeless tobacco. Contains reviews, tutorials, information and discussions.
Snus Authority - A blog dedicated to snus, snuff, and other forms of smokeless tobacco.
Snus Central - A popular news and information site on smokeless tobacco.

Tobacco products
Masticatories

fr:Tabac à mâcher